Guisborough is a market town and civil parish in the borough of Redcar and Cleveland, North Yorkshire, England. It lies north of the North York Moors National Park. Roseberry Topping, midway between the town and Great Ayton, is a landmark in the national park. At the 2011 census, the civil parish with outlying Upleatham, Dunsdale and Newton under Roseberry had a population of 17,777, of which 16,979 were in the town's built-up area. It was governed by an urban district and rural district in the North Riding of Yorkshire.

Etymology
Assessing the origin of the name Guisborough, Albert Hugh Smith commented that it was "difficult". From its first attestation in the Domesday Book into the 16th century, the second part sometimes derives from the originally Old English word burh ('town, fortification') and sometimes from the Old English word -burn ('stream'). It seems that the settlement was simply known by both names, the -burh/-borough forms predominate in the historical record and this survives today.

The origin of the first element is uncertain: Smith's best guess was from the Old Norse personal name Gígr in its genitive Gígs. If so, Guisborough once meant "Gígr's town". To this day the first element has a different spelling for the town from Gisborough Priory and Gisborough Hall in the town.

History

Roman

Some archaeologists date the town to the Roman occupation, when it may have been a military fortification. The discoveries of a few Roman artefacts such as the elaborate ceremonial Guisborough Helmet, support this but proof is still lacking.

The Guisborough Helmet is a Roman cavalry helmet found near the town in 1864. Its original protective cheek-pieces have not survived but the attachment holes can be seen in front of the helmet's ear guards. It is lavishly decorated with engraved and embossed figures indicating that it was probably used for display or cavalry tournaments, although possibly for battle as well. It was unearthed in what appears to be a carefully arranged deposition in a bed of gravel, distant from any known Roman sites. After its recovery during roadworks it was donated to the British Museum for restoration and display.

Medieval

Gighesbore is recorded in the Domesday Book in 1086 as a place within Langbaurgh Wapentake or hundred.

The ruined Gisborough Priory dates from the 12th century.

Victorian era
The town shared in the prosperity of the Industrial Revolution by being close to the ironstone mines of the North York Moors. One of the area's ironfounders, Sir Joseph Whitwell Pease, chose as his country seat the Gothic revival Hutton Hall designed by Alfred Waterhouse, at Hutton Lowcross, near Guisborough.

Gisborough Hall, a Victorian mansion, owned by the Chaloner family, was built in a Jacobean revival style in 1856. It is a Grade II listed building, but has undergone conversion into a hotel.

Recent history
 station was on the Middlesbrough–Guisborough branch of the North Eastern Railway; it closed in 1964. Extensive residential development occurred in the 1960s and 1970s, linked to the expansion of the chemical industry at Wilton and the steel industry at Redcar.

Governance
Guisborough's county authority since 1889, the North Riding of Yorkshire, was disbanded in 1974. The town was in the county of Cleveland's Langbaurgh borough from 1974 to 1996 and is now in the Redcar and Cleveland unitary authority borough of North Yorkshire.

Guisborough Town Hall was built on Westgate in 1821. When built, it was arcaded with a shambles on the ground floor and an assembly room on the first. The two-storey building was topped with a third storey in 1870. In 2015 Redcar and Cleveland Council acquired the building at auction and subsequently announced plans to redevelop it with financial support from the National Lottery Heritage Fund and Tees Valley Combined Authority, the building reopened in April 2022.

The town also has a parish council, which meets at Sunnyfield House.

Religion
 
The Anglican Church of St Nicholas houses the De Brus Cenotaph. A church may have existed here in 1290. The chancel of the present one dates from the late 15th century and the nave and interior have been altered. The church in its present form resulted from major rebuilding in 1903–1908, to a design by Temple Moore.

Community

Guisborough is the home of the East Cleveland Explorer Scout Unit for those aged 14–18, affiliated to the Scout Association. Activities include work on The Duke of Edinburgh's Award, Young Leaders volunteering, and over 200 different adventure activities. It has about 30 members. The 3rd Guisborough Scout Group (The Pioneers) at Belmangate was established in 1974.

There is also a group of volunteer trail builders working to provide free mountain-bike trails in the local forest. Local musicians are catered for at an open mic/jam session every Wednesday night.

Education
 Primary education is provided at Belmont, Galley Hill, Highcliffe, St Paulinus (Roman Catholic) and Chaloner Primary. Laurence Jackson School, an amalgamation of the earlier Northgate Junior and Park Lane schools at the eastern end of the town, is the only secondary school, and doubles as a Specialist Sports College. It marked its 50th anniversary in 2008.

Prior Pursglove College, a sixth-form college for GCSE, A level and AS level students, stands next to the parish church and priory ruins on the former site of Guisborough Grammar School, which it replaced after changes in the education system. It had been founded in 1561 by Robert Pursglove, the last Prior of Gisborough, as a charitable school for poor boys. It was accompanied by a set of almshouses for twelve pensioners.

Askham Bryan College of Agriculture has opened a Guisborough Centre on the same site as Prior Pursglove College. It consists of an animal management centre and a modern building, the Priory Centre, which the two colleges share.

Transport

Road

Two main roads cross at Guisborough, the A171 leading west to Middlesbrough and east to Whitby, and the A173 south-west to Stokesley and north-east as far as Skelton, where it joins the A174 coast road. Before the bypass was built, the A171 ran along Westgate, the town's main street, crossing the A173 at Chapel Beck Bridge. Just beyond the bypass to the north-east, a B-road heads north from the A173 to Redcar. Another minor route out of town, Wilton Lane, is a winding, almost single-track road running north to the village of Wilton and on to the ICI Wilton chemical works. There are two other lanes that lead out of town into the hills. Hutton Lane ends at Hutton Village, built mostly for local mining, agricultural and estate workers. Belmangate is an ancient funeral route.

Paths
 
The south of the town is bounded by the North York Moors National Park. Guisborough Forest, which is Forestry England land, clothes the edge of the moors. Through the forest, the ground climbs sharply from the plain to the moors behind. There are several rocky outcrops on the steep slope, including Highcliff Nab and the Hanging Stone. The woods are crossed by several rights of way, including Cleveland Way, but other paths and commission tracks are also open to walkers. Beyond the woods, the ground levels out to form Gisborough Moor.

Railway station

Until 1964, Guisborough was served by trains from Middlesbrough – the Middlesbrough & Guisborough Railway had its terminus at the now-demolished Guisborough station. Before 1958 it was possible to travel from Guisborough to Whitby and Scarborough, along the scenic North Yorkshire coast railway.

Economy

Guisborough market is held on Thursday and Saturday with a few stalls on Tuesday. Originally selling cattle and other livestock, the market developed into a general market for fruit and vegetables, clothing and flowers. It opens from early morning to late afternoon on the restored cobbles of Westgate, the main shopping street. Guisborough Museum, behind Westgate's Sunnyfield House, shows photographs of Guisborough's history and inhabitants.

One main employer in the town was The Shirt Factory. Towards the end of its existence it was acquired by Montague Burton of Leeds, but it closed in 1999. Other former employers were Blackett Hutton and Co., maker of medium high-integrity castings, and the civil engineering firm Henderson Campbell.

There is a working watermill at Tocketts Mill. On 15 January 2004, Guisborough was granted Fairtrade Town status. It is a commuter town for nearby Middlesbrough and has many working in the chemical plants around Teesside.

Sport

The King George V Ground, which hosts the club's home matches, is named after the king.

King George's Fields, adjacent to the football club, is a playing field with a small playground and a skate park. There is a swimming pool, built in 1968, at the fields. An eight-year campaign led by the late MP, Dr Ashok Kumar, secured the pool's refurbishment, which was completed in 2008–2009.

Guisborough Rugby Union Football club plays in Durham/Northumberland 2 division in the 2021–22 season. The area's constituent body is the Yorkshire Rugby Football Union, able to compete in the region's Silver Trophy.

Guisborough Cricket Club plays in the NYSD cricket league. In 2001–04 it equalled its record of four successive league wins. Past players have included the professionals Murray Goodwin (Sussex and Zimbabwe), Desmond Haynes and Phil Simmons (both West Indies), Imran Jan (Trinidad and Tobago), Sean Clingeleffer (Tasmania) and Greg Todd (Otago).

Notable people

Willie Applegarth (1890–1958), Olympic track and field athlete
John Gilbert Baker (1836–1920), botanist
Mark Benton (born 1965), character actor
Robert de Brus, 1st Lord of Annandale (died before 1138), Norman baron and knight, founder of the Bruce dynasty of Scotland and England
John Bulmer (1867–1917), first-class cricketer
Bob Champion (born 1948), steeplechase jockey who won the 1981 Grand National, despite being recently diagnosed with cancer
Henry Savile Clarke (1841–1893), dramatist and critic
James Coppinger (born 1981), professional footballer with Doncaster Rovers
Ralph Gaudie (1876–1951), professional footballer, notably with Arsenal
Sean Gregan (born 1974), professional footballer
Robert Holman (1952-2021), writer
Lawry Lewin (born 1985), television actor
Rod Liddle (born 1960), journalist, at school in Guisborough
Katy Livingston (born 1984), Olympic modern pentathlete
Richard Milward (born 1984), novelist
Elinor Lyon (1921–2008), children's writer born in the town
Alan Ramage (born 1957), cricketer
Mark Robinson (born 1981), footballer with Guisborough Town
Selina Scott (born 1951), head girl at Laurence Jackson School, later newsreader and presenter of The Clothes Show
J. Denis Summers-Smith (born 1920), Scottish-born ornithologist and tribologist
Walter of Guisborough (fl. 13th c.), medieval chronicler
Thomas Ward (1652–1708), author who converted to Catholicism
Joseph Whitehead (1814–1894), Canadian railway pioneer and political figure
Will Muir, professional rugby union player

Climate
The area generally has warm summers and relatively mild winters. During the year, on average there is around 650mm of rainfall.

References

External links

St Nicholas Parish Church
Local history material collated by Walter Brelstaff

 
Places in the Tees Valley
Redcar and Cleveland
Civil parishes in North Yorkshire
Market towns in North Yorkshire
Towns in North Yorkshire
Elinor Lyon